David Wayne Baria (born December 4, 1962) is an American politician, attorney, and former contractor. A trial lawyer by trade, Baria was a Democratic member of the Mississippi House of Representatives representing the 122nd district until the end of the 2019 legislative session. He also served as the House Minority Leader. Baria was a member of the Mississippi Senate before he was elected to the retiring J. P. Compretta's seat in the Mississippi House of Representatives. Baria was the Democratic nominee for the 2018 United States Senate election in Mississippi.

Baria is the former chairman of the NCSL Gulf and Atlantic States Task Force. He is also a member of the National Conference of Environmental Legislators, Bay St. Louis Rotary Club, Leadership Hancock County, Mississippi Bar, and a fellow of the Mississippi Bar Foundation. The Board of United Policyholders, a national advocacy group for insureds, includes Baria on their board of directors. He was also chairman of the Hancock County Youth Court Task Force dedicated to combatting the foster care crisis in that area. In March 2019, Baria announced he would not seek re-election to the legislature.

Early life and education

Baria was born in Pascagoula, Mississippi in 1962. He earned a Bachelor of Science degree in criminal justice from the University of Southern Mississippi and a Juris Doctor at the University of Mississippi School of Law.

Career

Mississippi Senate 
In 2007, Baria ran for district 46 of the Mississippi Senate and defeated James Overstreet, 77% to 23%. He attributes his initial call to public service to seeing and experiencing the devastation wrought by Hurricane Katrina. Baria represented the 46th District from 2008 to 2011. The American Lung Association and the American Federation of Teachers awarded Baria with selective legislative awards for his work in the Senate.

Mississippi House of Representatives 
Baria ran for the 122nd district of the Mississippi House of Representatives in 2011, and defeated his Republican challenger Dorothy Wilcox 58% to 41%. Baria was then reelected to district 122 in 2015 after narrowly defeating Republican Mickey Lagasse 51% to 49%, after Governor Phil Bryant and Lieutenant Governor Tate Reeves campaigned for Lagasse.

Baria was a member of five different committees in the House: Appropriations, Universities and Colleges, Judiciary B, Judiciary En Banc, and Youth and Family Services. Baria was selected as one of three Democratic Floor Leaders for the Mississippi House Democratic Caucus in 2012, and in 2016 his colleagues selected him to serve as Minority Leader.

Insurance reform 
Since Hurricane Katrina, Baria has introduced several bills to cap the premiums that insurance companies can charge for homeowners and flood insurance.

Baria has also introduced legislation to create a "Policy Holder's Bill of Rights," which would prohibit "anti-concurrent causation clauses," which allow insurance companies to avoid paying for any damage to homes where wind acts concurrently with flooding to cause damage to the insured property.

BP oil spill settlement 

In 2015, Baria introduced a bill to require that 80% of the funds from the Deepwater Horizon oil spill be sent back to the Gulf Coast. The bill was defeated by the Republican controlled legislature, however, which opted to keep the money in the state's general fund. Baria renewed these efforts in 2017 with the support of several Republican legislators from the Gulf Coast, but they were unsuccessful.

Other legislation and policy positions 
In 2010, Baria proposed bills in the senate offering tax incentives for homeowners who install solar power, as well as allowing net metering.

After joining the Mississippi House in 2012, Baria successfully sponsored a bill to require safety enclosures for swimming pools. That same year, he introduced several other bills, including bills to  increase the death benefit payable to law enforcement officers and firefighters killed in the line of duty; authorize individuals to brew beer at home; create a "Patient's Bill of Rights; prohibit smoking in certain public places and private places of employment; and create a state version of the False Claims Act to allow whistleblowers who report fraud against the government to collect part of the award. All of these bills died in committee, however.

After controversy in 2012 over then-Governor Haley Barbour's pardon of two convicted murderers who worked at the Mississippi Governor's Mansion, Baria introduced legislation prohibiting governors from issuing pardons during the last 90 days of their term. The bill died in committee.

In 2015, Baria filed a bill to legalize industrial hemp production, and in 2017 Baria filed bills to raise the minimum wage and require equal pay for men and women performing the same work. The Republican controlled legislature blocked these efforts, however.

Baria penned an op-ed after the 2017 murder of a protester during the Unite the Right rally, calling for the state to remove the Confederate imagery from the Mississippi state flag.

In 2018, Baria voted for a bill to exempt recent college graduates from state income taxes if they stay in the state for three years after graduation from a four-year college or university and to grant them an additional two-year exemption if they buy a house or establish a business with at least one additional employee.

During his tenure, Baria has been a vocal critic of the corporate tax cuts passed by the Republican controlled legislature, stating that they deprive the state of revenue that could be used to pay for other state programs. He has also been a vocal supporter of expanding Medicaid to cover more than 300,000 Mississippians who lack health insurance. Baria also supports state-funded universal preschool and two tuition-free years of community college.

2018 U.S. Senate race 

On February 28, 2018, Baria declared his candidacy for the Senate seat held by Republican Roger Wicker. On June 26, he defeated businessman and venture capitalist Howard Sherman in a runoff to officially claim the Democratic nomination. James Carville was an unpaid campaign consultant and has held New Orleans fundraisers for the candidate. Baria finished second of four candidates, getting 39.1% of the vote.

Retirement 
On March 1, 2019, with the publishing of both political parties' nomination lists, it was revealed that Baria chose not to seek re-election to the 122nd district. Had he run, Baria would have faced a Republican challenger Brent Anderson, the public works director of Waveland, Mississippi. Wendy McDonald was the Democratic candidate in November's general election.

Controversy

During Baria's 2011 Mississippi House of Representatives campaign, the Advance Mississippi PAC, a proponent of the Republican candidate, Dorothy Wilcox, sent out direct-mail campaign material with inaccurate information about his voting record. The PAC falsely accused Baria of voting to raise his pay and raise taxes on food. Baria also contended that the PAC falsely accused him of taking money from his clients. Baria filed a defamation suit against the PAC. Baria stated, "It's not illegal to run a negative campaign, or to make fun of people. I don't like that, but it's not illegal. But we do have laws saying you cannot publish lies about people. These PACs are going to push the envelope as far as they can, and somebody needs to hold them accountable."

However, Baria stated that he was willing to dismiss the case if the PAC published an apology. The executive director of the Advance Mississippi PAC, Steve Simmons, and the PAC's treasurer, Randy Stephens, issued a full-page advertisement to apologize to Representative Baria. The ad read: "On behalf of themselves individually and the PAC offer their sincere apology to Rep. David Baria, D-Bay St. Louis, for their publication of false and defamatory ads during the 2011 legislative campaign." The ad was placed in two coastal newspapers.

Personal life

David Baria is married to Marcie Baria. They have four children. Baria is an avid sportsman and enjoys fishing and boating with his family. He is also a member of his local Rotary Club and Kiwanis.

References

External links
Project Vote Smart - Senator David W. Baria (MS) old profile
Follow the Money - David Baria
2007 campaign contributions

|-

1962 births
21st-century American politicians
Candidates in the 2018 United States Senate elections
Living people
Democratic Party members of the Mississippi House of Representatives
Democratic Party Mississippi state senators
People from Pascagoula, Mississippi
University of Mississippi School of Law alumni
University of Southern Mississippi alumni